Christopher William Wallace Rea (born 22 October 1943) is a former Scotland international rugby union player. He was capped 13 times for Scotland, scoring three tries, including the winning try in the 1971 Calcutta Cup.

Rea toured New Zealand in 1971 with the British and Irish Lions, scoring three tries. At the time played club rugby for Headingley FC in Leeds having previously played for West of Scotland F.C.

Rea became a sports journalist, working for the BBC amongst others, and became Head of Marketing at the MCC and then IRB Communications Manager in 2000. He also hosted the BBC's canoeing contest 'Paddles Up' during the 1980s and early 1990s. He is a former student of the University of St Andrews.

References

Notes
 Massie, Allan A Portrait of Scottish Rugby (Polygon, Edinburgh)

1943 births
Living people
Alumni of the University of St Andrews
British & Irish Lions rugby union players from Scotland
Dundee HSFP players
People educated at the High School of Dundee
Rugby union centres
Scotland international rugby union players
Scottish rugby union players
University of St Andrews RFC players
West of Scotland FC players